The Extra EA-260 is a hand-built, single-seat aerobatic aircraft derived from the Extra 230 and first flown in 1986. Designed by aerobatic pilot Walter Extra based on the layout of the Extra 230, the Extra 260 is a higher performance version of its predecessor with 60% more power and 18% increase in weight. The first EA-260 was flown by Patty Wagstaff to victory in two U.S. National Aerobatic Championships, in 1991 and 1992, and then retired to the Smithsonian Institution when she obtained an Extra 300S.

Design
The Extra 260 is based on the design of the Extra EA-230, and the two aircraft share many similarities. The Extra 260 has a welded steel tube fuselage covered in fabric with a carbon/glass hybrid composite empennage (i.e., the tail assembly, including the horizontal and vertical stabilizers, elevators, and rudder), and a bubble canopy. The monocoque wings have a Polish pine wood spar with birch plywood skins. A symmetrical airfoil, mounted with a zero angle of incidence, provides equal performance in both upright and inverted flight. The landing gear is fixed taildragger style with composite main legs and fiberglass wheel pants. The piston-engined powerplant is a fuel-injected Lycoming AEIO-540-D4A5 and has a 4-bladed constant-speed MT composite propeller.

Operational history
The first EA260 built was donated to the Smithsonian Institution where it was at one time on display. Additionally there is one EA260 registered with the Federal Aviation Administration in the US, one registered in the United Kingdom with the Civil Aviation Authority and one registered in France with the Directorate General for Civil Aviation, for a total of four.

Specifications (EA-260)

References

External links

1980s German sport aircraft
EA-230
EA-260
Aerobatic aircraft
Mid-wing aircraft
Single-engined tractor aircraft
Aircraft first flown in 1986